La Harpe Township is one of twenty-four townships in Hancock County, Illinois, USA.  As of the 2010 census, its population was 1,473 and it contained 714 housing units.

La Harpe Township was named for Jean-Baptiste Bénard de la Harpe, a French explorer.

Geography

Cities, towns, villages
 La Harpe

Unincorporated towns
 Disco at 
(This list is based on USGS data and may include former settlements.)

Cemeteries
The township contains LaHarpe City Cemetery.

Major highways
  Illinois Route 9
  Illinois Route 94

Airports and landing strips
 Housewright Airport

Landmarks
 Mayor Memorial Park

Demographics

School districts
LaHarpe Community School District 347, grades K-8, &
Illini West High School District 307

Political districts
 Illinois's 18th congressional district
 State House District 94
 State Senate District 47

References
 United States Census Bureau 2008 TIGER/Line Shapefiles
 
 United States National Atlas

External links
 City-Data.com
 Illinois State Archives
 Township Officials of Illinois

Townships in Hancock County, Illinois
Townships in Illinois